is a Japanese machine tool builder based in Oguchi, Japan. In the United States, Russia and UK it is known as Mazak.

History
The company was founded in 1919 in Nagoya by Sadakichi Yamazaki as a small company making pots and pans. During the 1920s it progressed through mat-making machinery to woodworking machinery to metalworking machine tools, especially lathes. The company was part of Japan's industrial buildup before and during World War II, then, like the rest of Japanese industry, was humbled by the war's outcome.

During the 1950s and 1960s, under the founder's sons, Yamazaki revived, and during the 1960s it established itself as an exporter to the American market. During the 1970s and 1980s it established a larger onshore presence in the USA, including machine tool-building operations, and since then it has become one of the most important companies in that market and the global machine tool market.

In 1980s, the European manufacturing plant was established in Worcester, U.K., and a worldwide sales and customer support network was created. Currently, the corporation runs 10 factories worldwide - 5 in Japan, 2 in China, 1 in Singapore, 1 in the USA, 1 in the UK.

Gallery

References

Bibliography

External links

Mazak Global portal to regional sites
Exclusive representative of Mazak machine tools for some provinces of Lombardy, Italy:  https://tecnomacsystems.com/prodotti-nuovo.php

Manufacturing companies of Japan
Industrial machine manufacturers
Machine tool builders
Multinational companies headquartered in Japan
Companies based in Aichi Prefecture
Japanese brands
Manufacturing companies established in 1919
Japanese companies established in 1919